Richard Huschke (6 August 1893 – 11 January 1980) was a German racing cyclist. He won the German National Road Race in 1922 and 1925.

References

External links

1893 births
1980 deaths
German male cyclists
Cyclists from Berlin
German cycling road race champions
20th-century German people